How to Survive In + In The Woods is the second studio album by the American band Woods, released in 2007 on Woodsist.

Track listing

References

2007 albums
Woods (band) albums
Woodsist albums